Nisaki ( meaning "little island") is a small sea-side village in north-east Corfu, Greece. It was named after the small island in its bay. During the 20th century, probably with the advent of mass tourism, several tavernas were built on this islet and a jetty was constructed, linking it permanently to the mainland. The main village of Nisaki grew up on the hill above this inlet where a church, school, cafe and many other buildings are located.

Settlements

Nisaki, pop. 278
Apolysoi, pop. 21
Vinglatouri, pop. 52
Katavolos, pop. 19

Population

See also

List of settlements in the Corfu regional unit

References

External links
 Nisaki at the GTP Travel Pages

Populated places in Corfu (regional unit)